Robert Strange may refer to:
Robert Strange (American politician) (1796–1854), U.S. senator
Robert Straunge (fl. 1614), or Strange, English politician, MP for Cirencester
Robert Strange (MP for Bristol), see Bristol
Robert Strange (engraver) (1721–1792), English engraver
Robert Strange (bishop) (1857–1914), bishop of the Episcopal Diocese of East Carolina